Christian I, known as "the Quarrelsome" (died 1167), was Count of Oldenburg from 1143 to 1167. He was son of Elimar II, Count of Oldenburg and wife Eilika von Werl-Rietberg, daughter of Count Heinrich von Rietberg.

Marriage and issue
He married Kunigunde and had: 
 Maurice, Count of Oldenburg (c. 1145 - c. 1211)

References

Christian
12th-century German nobility
1167 deaths
Year of birth unknown